Irene Franchini (born ) is an Italian recurve and compound archer and part of the national team.

She competed in the team event and individual event at the 2000 Summer Olympics. She won the gold medal at the 2016 World Indoor Archery Championships in the compound women's individual event and the bronze medal in the compound women's team event. Together with her teammates Franchini won the bronze medal at the 2021 European Archery Championships in Antalya, Turkey.

References

External links

1981 births
Living people
Italian female archers
Place of birth missing (living people)
Archers at the 2000 Summer Olympics
Olympic archers of Italy
Archers of Fiamme Azzurre
Competitors at the 2001 World Games
21st-century Italian women